Jagdfliegerführer Rumänien was formed July 1943 in Otopeni (Bucharest), Romania subordinated to Luftflotte 4. The headquarters was located at Otopeni, and from August 1944 in Budakpossibly Buzău?. The unit was disbanded on September 4, 1944.

The unit was known as Jagdfliegerführer Rumänien until February 7, 1944, when it was redesignated Jagdfliegerführer Balkan. It then was reformed on February 7, 1944 as Jagdabschnittsführer Rumänien.

Commanding officers
Oberstleutnant Bernhard Woldenga, July 1943 - February 1944
Oberstleutnant Eduard Neumann, February 1944 - August 1944

References
Notes

References

Luftwaffe Fliegerführer
Military units and formations established in 1943
Military units and formations disestablished in 1944